ARY Film Award for Best Supporting Actor is one of the ARY Film Awards of Merit presented annually by the ARY Digital Network and Entertainment Channel to recognize the male actor who has delivered an outstanding performance while working in the film industry. Since its inception, however, the award has commonly been referred to as the AFA for Best Supporting Actor. While actors are nominated for this award by AFA members who are actors and actresses themselves, winners are selected by the AFA membership as a whole.

History

The Best Supporting Actor category originates with the 1st ARY Film Awards ceremony since 2014. The Best Supporting Actor is awarded by viewers voting and known as Best Supporting Actor Viewers Choice but officially it is termed as Best Supporting Actor. Since ARY Film Awards has been just started, this category has not a brief history.

Winners and nominees 
For the Best Supporting Actor winner which is decided by Viewers, but simply regarded as Best Supporting Actor as compared to other four Jury Awards which has superfix of Jury. As of the first ceremony, total of five actors were nominated. This category is among fourteen Viewers Awards in ARY Film Awards.

Date and the award ceremony shows that the 2010 is the period from 2010-2020 (10 years-decade), while the year above winners and nominees shows that the film year in which they were releases, and the figure in bracket shows the ceremony number, for example; an award ceremony is held for the films of its previous year.

2010s

References

External links 

 

ARY Film Award winners
ARY Film Awards